Huangtuling station is a subway station in Tianxin District/ Yuhua District, Changsha, Hunan, China, operated by the Changsha subway operator Changsha Metro. It entered revenue service on June 28, 2016.

History 
The station opened on 28 June 2016.

Layout

Surrounding area
Entrance No. 2: Hunan Institute for Non-ferrous Metal Research
Entrance No. 7: Changsha Song and Dance Theatre, Shennong Grand Hotel

References

Railway stations in Hunan
Railway stations in China opened in 2016